Nadere Reformatie (Dutch Second Reformation or Further Reformation) is the period of church history in the Netherlands, following the Reformation, from roughly 1600 until 1750.

History 
The period and its representatives are known for their desire to apply the principles of the Reformation to their day – their homes, churches, and, indeed, all sectors of Dutch society in the seventeenth and early eighteenth century. In their balance and value of both orthodoxy as well as piety, the Nadere Reformatie resembles English Puritanism and German Pietism.

In fact, Puritanism had much influence on the Nadere Reformatie. Many Puritan works were translated into Dutch during this time. Moreover, many Dutch visiting students learned about Puritan ideas from English universities.

The two leading figures of the period are a professor, Gisbertus Voetius, and a pastor, Wilhelmus à Brakel. Brakel's main work, the Redelijke Godsdienst, an explanation, defense, and application of the Reformed faith, has been translated into English.

Notable figures

Jean Taffin (1529–1602)
Willem Teellinck (1579–1629)
Godefridus Udemans (c.1581-1649)
Gisbertus Voetius (1589–1676)
Johannes Hoornbeeck (1617–1666)
Andreas Essenius (1618–1677)
Jodocus van Lodenstein (1620–677)
Petrus van Mastricht (1630–1706)
Simon Oomius (1630–1706)
Jacobus Koelman (1632–1695)
Wilhelmus à Brakel (1635–1711)
Hermanus Witsius (1636–1708)
Wilhelmus Schortinghuis (1700–1750)

References

External links
Sources and History of the Nadere Reformatie

17th century in the Dutch Republic
17th-century Calvinism
18th-century Calvinism
Calvinism in the Dutch Republic